The Lotus 51 was an open-wheel Formula Ford race car built in 1967 by the British motorsport team Lotus. It was powered by a  Ford Crossflow four-cylinder engine (the same type of engine used in the Ford Cortina), developing a respectable , which drove the rear wheels through either a Renault R-8 type 330 4-speed, or a Hewland 5-speed manual transmission.

The Lotus 51 became a bestseller for Colin Chapman and the Lotus team in 1967. 218 vehicles were built and sold (some sources speak of only 150 vehicles). The price for one vehicle was £955.

The car was derived from, and based on, the Lotus 31, a Formula 3 car from Lotus. In 1969 the car was replaced by the Lotus 61. In 1968 the 51R - a one-off - was built. The car had wider sidepods and was originally intended as a concept for a successor. The car was sold for £1095 to a US collector who never entered the 51R in racing competitions.

References 

Formula Ford cars
51
Open wheel racing cars